The 2011 Benue State gubernatorial election was the 7th gubernatorial election of Benue State. Held on April 26, 2011, the People's Democratic Party nominee Gabriel Suswam won the election, defeating Steven Ugbah of the Action Congress of Nigeria.

Results 
A total of 13 candidates contested in the election. Gabriel Suswam from the People's Democratic Party won the election, defeating Steven Ugbah from the Action Congress of Nigeria. Valid votes was 1,110,606.

References 

Benue State gubernatorial elections
Benue gubernatorial
Benue State gubernatorial election